Jean-Paul de Marigny (born 21 January 1964, in Mauritius) is an Assistant Coach with Melbourne Victory. Jean-Paul is a former Socceroo.

Managerial career

Melbourne Victory
de Marigny served as an assistant coach of A-League side Melbourne Victory from 2013 to 2015, departing on 22 May 2015 to return home to Sydney to be with family and support his wife Donna who underwent breast surgery for cancer.

Newcastle Jets
On 18 June 2015, de Marigny was announced as assistant coach of the Newcastle Jets, under Scott Miller.

Return to Melbourne Victory
On 31 May 2016, de Marigny returned to Melbourne Victory.

Western Sydney Wanderers
On 6 June 2018 Western Sydney Wanderers announced that de Marigny was joining the club to take over the vacant assistant coach position. Following the sacking of head coach Markus Babbel on 20 January 2020, de Marigny was named as the caretaker head coach for the club. He was released on 12 October 2020 after a statement was released by the club. His replacement was Carl Robinson.

Second return to Melbourne Victory
On 10 March 2021, de Marigny returned to Melbourne Victory as an assistant coach.

Managerial statistics

References

1964 births
Living people
Australian soccer players
Australia international soccer players
Mauritian emigrants to Australia
Mauritian footballers
Mauritian expatriate footballers
National Soccer League (Australia) players
Marconi Stallions FC players
Sydney Olympic FC players
Australian soccer coaches
New South Wales Institute of Sport alumni
Association football defenders
Marconi Stallions FC managers
Sydney United 58 FC managers